Raúl Chapado (born 4 May 1970 in Ávila) is a retired male triple jumper from Spain. His personal best was 16.83 metres, achieved in August 1997 in Rovereto. He had a better indoor personal best, of 16.87 metres. This was a national record at the time. He is the president of the Royal Spanish Athletics Federation.

Achievements

References

External links

1970 births
Living people
Spanish male triple jumpers
Athletes (track and field) at the 2000 Summer Olympics
Olympic athletes of Spain
Mediterranean Games bronze medalists for Spain
Mediterranean Games medalists in athletics
Athletes (track and field) at the 2001 Mediterranean Games